The 1947 Tipperary Senior Hurling Championship was the 57th staging of the Tipperary Senior Hurling Championship since its establishment by the Tipperary County Board in 1887. The championship began on 28 September 1947 and ended on 26 October 1947.

Thurles Sarsfields were the defending champions.

On 26 October 1947, Carrick Swans won the championship after a 5-04 to 2-02 defeat of Borrisoleigh in the final at Clonmel Sportsfield. It remains their only championship title.

Qualification

Results

Semi-finals

Final

References

Tipperary
Tipperary Senior Hurling Championship